The Federation of Clinical Immunology Societies (FOCIS) was initially established as a cross-disciplinary meeting, holding its first Annual Meeting in 2001. It subsequently became a 501(c)3 organization in 2003.  Its mission is to improve human health through immunology by fostering interdisciplinary approaches to both understand and treat immune-based diseases. FOCIS currently has 58 Member Societies, representing roughly 65,000 clinician scientists.

Its member societies include: American Academy of Allergy, Asthma, and Immunology, British Society for Immunology, European Academy of Allergy and Clinical Immunology, European Society for Primary Immunodeficiencies, and World Allergy Organization.

References

External links
 

Medical and health organizations based in Wisconsin
Organizations established in 2001
Medical associations based in the United States
Immunology organizations
International medical and health organizations